Elliott C. Chamberlain (born 29 April 1992) is a Welsh footballer who currently plays for Leicestershire Senior League Premier Division side Barlestone St Giles, where he plays as a forward.

Playing career
Born in Paget, Bermuda, Chamberlain has played club football for Leicester City, Stockport County, AFC Telford United, Exeter City, and Bath City.

He was released by Exeter at the end of the 2013–14 season. He subsequently signed for Gloucester City for the 2014–15 season, and Corby Town for the 2014–15 season. making 32 appearances and scoring 7 goals. Chamberlain signed for Barwell for the 2015–16 season. Following his departure from Barwell, Chamberlain moved to Leicestershire based team Barlestone St Giles.

International career
Chamberlain has represented Wales at the U17, U19 and U21 international level.

References

External links

1992 births
Living people
Welsh footballers
Wales youth international footballers
Wales under-21 international footballers
Leicester City F.C. players
Stockport County F.C. players
AFC Telford United players
Exeter City F.C. players
Bath City F.C. players
Gloucester City A.F.C. players
Corby Town F.C. players
Barwell F.C. players
English Football League players
Association football forwards